Pavunu Pavunuthan is a 1991 Indian Tamil-language drama film written and directed by K. Bhagyaraj. He also starred and composed the music. The film was released on 14 April 1991. It was dubbed into Telugu as Chilipi Sipayi and released on 24 January 1992.

Synopsis 
The story starts with a flashback of Chinnu on a train talking to other passengers about his life. Chinnu is a commando captain who visits a village for vacation. He tries to catch a girl, Pavunu.She rejects his offer as she is waiting for her uncle to marry. He left the village around 20 years ago, at age 7,as his father beat him for his childish mischief. Pavunu's maternal uncle is also eagerly waiting for his son to return. One day a letter for Arumuga Gounder was sent by his son, which reveals that he will arrive in 10 days and is married. On hearing the news about marriage, Pavunu tries suicide. Meanwhile Chinnu reveals that he was his uncle and told her that he pranked for fun as a stranger. Chinnu's sister insists that Pavunu marry Chinnu. He is a military who may leave on a sudden call anytime. Chinnu resisted the plan, but the villagers compelled him to marry. 

A few minutes before the ceremony information from the Army notifies Arumuga Gounder that his son had died. Chinnu appeared as a fraud among all. Later it is understood by family and village persons that he tried to do well by not disappointing the family members, as Gounder's family is poor and eagerly waiting the son's return. Pavunu is also sensitive about her uncle. 

Actually Chinnu told his sister that he is not his real brother and he lied only to prevent Pavunu'suicide. Chinnu asked her to reveal this to Pavunu, but she rejected it and convinced Chinnu to keep it secret between them as Pavunu's life will be in vain if revealed. After some time things get normal and Chinnu tries to convince Pavunu. 

The president of the village arranged a marriage invitation for Pavunu and Chinnu secretly to induce a view that Chinnu is compelling Pavunu to marry. The president and Chinnu already had issues on a minor matter. On hearing this, Chinnu takes it as good because he knows that even Pavunu had the idea to marry even though she is upset. One day before marriage Pavunu reveals that she cannot marry him, even though she had an affair, because she tattooed her uncle's name on her breast. Chinnu leaves the village the day before the wedding. Nearly 10 years later Chinnu returns.....

Cast 
 K. Bhagyaraj as Chinnu
 Rohini as Pavunu
 Kuladeivam Rajagopal as Arumuga Gounder

Soundtrack 
Soundtrack was composed by K. Bhagyaraj.

Reception 
N. Krishnaswamy of The Indian Express wrote, "The story line keeps you guessing about  what is going to come at every turn, and the mix of comedy, sentiment, characterisation and plot development meshes well to create a film of such impact".

References

External links 
 

1990s Tamil-language films
1991 films
Films directed by K. Bhagyaraj
Indian drama films
Films scored by K. Bhagyaraj